The 1995–96 Football League season was Birmingham City Football Club's 93rd in the English football league system. They finished in 15th place in the 24-team Football League First Division, to which they were promoted as Division Two champions in 1994–95. They entered the 1995–96 FA Cup at the third round, losing in that round to Wolverhampton Wanderers after a replay, and entered the League Cup in the first round and progressed to the semi-final, in which they lost on aggregate score to Leeds United. They also took part in the last season of the Anglo-Italian Cup, losing in the quarter-final after a penalty shootout.

At the end of the season, club owner David Sullivan dismissed Barry Fry as manager and replaced him with playing legend Trevor Francis.

Football League First Division

League table (part)

Note that goals scored took precedence over goal difference as a tiebreaker in the Football League.

Results summary

FA Cup

League Cup

Anglo-Italian Cup

 some sources give Tamburini o.g.

Transfers

In

Out

  Brackets round a club denote the player joined that club after his Birmingham City contract expired.
 * Part of the deal in which Gary Breen joined Birmingham from Peterborough United for £250,000.
 § Part of the deal in which Paul Barnes joined Birmingham from York City for £350,000.

Loan in

Loan out

Appearances and goals

Numbers in parentheses denote appearances as substitute.
Players with name struck through and marked  left the club during the playing season.
Players with names in italics and marked * were on loan from another club for the whole of their season with Birmingham.

See also
Birmingham City F.C. seasons

Sources
 
 
 For match dates, league positions and results: 
 For lineups, appearances, goalscorers and attendances: Matthews (2010), Complete Record, pp. 426–27, 477–78.
 For transfers:

References

Birmingham City F.C. seasons
Birmingham City